Mobolaji Bank Anthony Way is a four to six lane divided arterial road cutting through southern Ikeja, Nigeria. The road begins after interchanging Ikorodu Road or the A1 in Maryland. From here, it travels northwest to bypass Maryland, Ikeja GRA, and  Computer Village. At its western end, it interchanges with Agege Motor Road or the A5.

Streets in Lagos